Janko Štefe (born 26 January 1923, date of death unknown) was a Slovenian alpine skier. He competed in three events at the 1952 Winter Olympics, representing Yugoslavia.

References

1923 births
Year of death missing
Slovenian male alpine skiers
Olympic alpine skiers of Yugoslavia
Alpine skiers at the 1952 Winter Olympics
People from Tržič